Polamuru is a village in West Godavari district of the Indian state of Andhra Pradesh.

Demographics 

 Census of India, Polamuru had a population of 6170. The total population constitute, 3118 males and 3052 females with a sex ratio of 979 females per 1000 males. 561 children are in the age group of 0–6 years, with sex ratio of 759 The average literacy rate stands at 76.48%.

References

Villages in West Godavari district